Tyler Anbinder (born September 26, 1962) is an American historian known for his influential work on the pre-civil war period in U.S. history.

Books
 Nativism and Slavery: The Northern Know Nothings and the Politics of the 1850s. New York: Oxford University Press, 1992.  Winner, 1993, Avery Craven Prize of the Organization of American Historians for the most original book on the coming of the Civil War, the Civil War years, or the Era of Reconstruction.
 Five Points: The Nineteenth-Century New York City Neighborhood that Invented Tap Dance, Stole Elections, and Became the World's Most Notorious Slum. New York: Free Press, 2001. Named a Notable Book by the New York Times (2001) and one of "Twenty-Five Books to Remember" by the New York Public Library (2001).
 City of Dreams: The 400-Year Epic History of Immigrant New York. Published October 18, 2016 by Houghton Mifflin Harcourt,   Winner of the Mark Lynton History Prize.

References

External links

1962 births
Living people
21st-century American historians
21st-century American male writers
American male non-fiction writers